Quitralco Fjord ( or Fiordo Quitralco) is a fjord in Aysén Region, Chile. The fjord from Moraleda Channel in the southwest to the Liquiñe-Ofqui Fault in the northwest. Indeed, at the head of the fjord there is an underwater fault scarp of Liquiñe-Ofqui Fault. Mate Grande Volcano lies a few kilometers to the northeast of the fjord's head and Mount Hudson Volcano is visible from the fjord. There are hot springs along the fjord. Most of the near-shore vegetation is made op of ferns and bushes. Trees that grow around the fjord include Nothofagus dombeyi (coigüe) and Drimys winteri (canelo).

References

Fjords of Chile
Bodies of water of Aysén Region